Ohio's 3rd senatorial district has historically spanned vast portions of central Ohio from the Miami Valley to the Scioto Valley, but currently encompasses approximately a third of Franklin County.  It encompasses Ohio House districts 17, 19 and 20.  It has a Cook PVI of EVEN.  The district was represented by Ted Gray from 1951 to 1994, the longest tenure of any member of the Ohio Senate.  Its current Senator is Republican Michele Reynolds. She resides in Canal Winchester, a city located in Franklin and Fairfield counties.

List of senators

References

External links
Ohio's 3rd district senator at the 130th Ohio General Assembly official website

Ohio State Senate districts